King of Tokyo is a tabletop game using custom dice, cards, and boards, designed by Richard Garfield and released in 2011. A New York City-based edition, King of New York, was published in 2014. The game was re-released in 2016, with all-new artwork and characters.

Gameplay
Players choose one of the six monsters, consisting of mutant monsters, gigantic robots and other creatures. Each monster has no difference from each other apart from name and design. Players take turn rolling six dice, and may reroll some of them as they wish, as in the dice game Yahtzee.

Die faces are energy, health, attack, 1, 2, and 3. Rolling an energy icon allows players to collect energy tokens equal to the number of energy icons they rolled; these tokens are used to buy power cards. Rolling a health icon restores players' health by one each, to the maximum of 10. Rolling an attack icon while Tokyo is unoccupied gives a player the opportunity to occupy "Tokyo City" and gain a victory point. Once "Tokyo City" is occupied, any attack icon rolled will result in damage to either the player in Tokyo or all players not in Tokyo, depending on whose turn it is, equal to the number of attack icons rolled. When a player outside of Tokyo rolls any number of attack icons while Tokyo is already occupied, that player also gets to choose whether to take over the spot at the expense of the previous occupier. Rolling three 1s grants the player 1 victory point, three 2s are worth 2 points, and three 3s score 3. Any additional same-numbered die scores 1 additional point each.

Being in Tokyo gives a player a number of advantages, such as two victory points for starting their turn in Tokyo and the ability to attack all players not in Tokyo. On the flip side, the player in Tokyo cannot heal, i.e. any health icon they roll does nothing, and will always be targeted by other players' attack rolls. When a player's health hits zero, that player is out of play for the rest of the game. There are two occupation spots in Tokyo, with the second spot, dubbed "Tokyo Bay", only available as long as there are more than four players.

The winner is the first player to collect 20 victory points or the last player still in play.

Editions
 The first edition of King of Tokyo includes six monsters (Alienoid, Cyber Bunny, Gigazaur (based on Godzilla), The King (based on King Kong), Kraken (based on Cthulhu) and Meka Dragon).
 The second edition of King of Tokyo replaced Cyber Bunny and Kraken with Cyber Kitty and Space Penguin and made spelling changes to some monsters. Target (USA) had a special release which replaced Gigazaur with Baby Gigazaur.
 King of Tokyo Dark Edition is a limited-print standalone game. It is essentially a reprint of the first edition, with all six monsters from that edition, including Cyber Bunny and Kraken. It features new artwork and also introduces the new wickedness gameplay mechanic.
 King of Tokyo Monster Box is a compilation of the game released in 2021. This version includes the base game set (2nd edition), the Power Up! expansion, the Halloween collector pack, and the Baby Gigazaur monster, in addition to 11 exclusive cards and a dice tray.

Spin-offs
 2014's King of New York is a standalone game with identical gameplay mechanics and introduces six new monsters (Captain Fish, Sheriff, Kong, Mantis, Rob, and Drakonis) attacking the boroughs of New York City. The new game features to this standalone game include buildings to destroy and human military forces that can fight back. The Power Up expansion for King of New York, released in 2016, adds one new monster (Mega Shark) and includes 56 evolution cards for all seven monsters.
 2022's King of Monster Island  is a standalone cooperative game with similar gameplay mechanics using giant monsters.  It differs as players team up to battle boss characters rather than the players battling each other.

Expansions
 2012's Power Up! introduces 56 evolution cards, 7 tokens, and a new monster: Pandakaï. Re-released in 2017 with updated art as per the second edition of King of Tokyo and including 72 evolution cards.
 2013's Halloween collector pack includes 2 new monsters (Pumpkin Jack and Boogie Woogie) and their 16 evolution cards, 12 new costume power cards, promo card for King of New York, and 6 orange dice. Re-released in 2017 with updated art as per the second edition of King of Tokyo.
 2017 - Monster Pack 1: Cthulhu is a mini-expansion for both King of Tokyo and King of New York. It includes a new Monster (Cthulhu) with a player board and Evolution cards to use with the Power Up expansion to either base set. It also includes double-sided Cultist/Temple tiles (when you obtain a tile, you get a bonus) and Madness tokens (given out by certain Evolution cards to affect other players' dice rolls). 
 2017 - Monster Pack 2: King Kong is a mini-expansion for both King of Tokyo and King of New York. It includes a new Monster (King Kong) with a player board and Evolution cards to use with the Power Up expansion to either base set. It also includes Tokyo Tower for King of Tokyo and Empire State Building for King of New York, which are used for a new victory condition, where players try to obtain levels of the buildings during their turns. The first player to obtain all three levels of buildings wins.
 2018 - Monster Pack 3: Anubis is a mini-expansion for both King of Tokyo and King of New York. It includes a new Monster (Anubis) with a player board and Evolution cards to use with the Power Up expansion to either base set. It also includes a Die of Fate (pyramid-shaped die that causes certain effects when rolled with other dice), Curse Cards (revealed when a certain face appears on the Die of Fate), and the Golden Scarab Card.
 2019 - Monster Pack 4: Cybertooth is a mini-expansion for both King of Tokyo and King of New York. It includes a new Monster (Cybertooth) with a player board and Evolution cards to use with the Power Up expansion to either base set. It also includes a Berserk Die.
  2022 - King of Tokyo: Even More Wicked! is a micro-expansion that adds the wickedness gameplay mechanic to the base game that was only previously available in the Dark Edition.

Awards
 Golden Geek
 Best Children's Game (2012)
 Best Family Board Game (2012)
 Best Party Game (2012)
 Ludoteca Ideale (2012)
 Nederlandse Spellenprijs: Best Family Game (2013)

Honors
 Golden Geek
 Best Party Board Game Nominee (2011) 
 Best Board Game Artwork/Presentation Nominee (2012)
 Best Children's Board Game Nominee (2012)
 Best Family Board Game Nominee (2012)
 Best Party Board Game Nominee (2012)
 Best Thematic Board Game Nominee (2012)
 Japan Boardgame Prize Voters' Selection Nominee (2011)
 Lucca Games Best Family Game Nominee (2011)
 Lys Grand Public Finalist (2011)
 As d'Or - Jeu de l'Année Nominee (2012)
 Gouden Ludo Nominee (2012)
 Boardgames Australia Awards Best International Game Nominee (2013)
 Juego del Año Tico Nominee (2013)
 Nederlandse Spellenprijs Best Family Game Nominee (2013)

Reception
A board game review in The Wirecutter stated that the game has "a host of wacky characters" that make it fun, but that players could be sidelined by being eliminated early in the game.

References

External links

Iello
BoardGameKing

Richard Garfield games
Board games introduced in 2011